Events from 1615 in Ireland.

Incumbent
Monarch: James I

Events
April 18 – the "Native's Rebellion": Arthur Chichester, 1st Baron Chichester, Lord Deputy of Ireland, informs the Privy Council of England of a plot by Hugh McShane O'Neill, Brian Crossagh, Rory O'Cahan and Alexander McDonald to massacre Ulster planters and of the arrest of many conspirators.
April 25 – convocation of the Church of Ireland ends, having adopted 104 Articles of Religion largely drafted by James Ussher.
July 31 – Cú Chonnacht Ó Cianáin (having been racked) and five others are sentenced to hanging for their part in the insurrection.
October 24 – James I's Parliament of Ireland is dissolved (its third session having been held 18 April–16 May).
Act makes parishes responsible for road maintenance, labourers and cottiers to supply six days free labour annually.

Births
Thomas Dillon, 4th Viscount Dillon, politician (d. c.1672)
Katherine Jones, Viscountess Ranelagh, intellectual (d. 1691)
William Lamport, adventurer (d. 1659)
Alexander MacDonnell, 3rd Earl of Antrim, military commander (d. 1699)

Deaths
c. August – Cú Chonnacht Ó Cianáin, rymer and insurrectionist (hanged)

References

 
1610s in Ireland
Ireland
Years of the 17th century in Ireland